Star Search 2019 is the 11th installment of the long-running Chinese talent competition Star Search, hosted by Mediacorp, since 1988. This was the first season of Star Search since 2010, returning after a nine-year hiatus. The grand prize includes a Mediacorp management contract and an Audi Q2 SUV (without Certificate of Entitlement).

The series premiered on 20 September on Toggle and 22 September on both Channel 8 and their YouTube channel. Three live telecast episodes were streamed live on 6 and 13 October (semi-finals), and 3 November (finals). The series concluded on a clip show titled The Journey aired on 8 and 10 November, on Toggle and Channel 8, respectively.

On the finals aired 3 November, Teoh Ze Tong, a 26-year-old Carousell assistant manager from Malaysia who mentored by Christopher Lee, was announced the winner, while Herman Keh from Team Christopher Lee and Ye Jia Yun from Team Chen Hanwei finished second and third, respectively. While the top three contestants were offered a contract and won respective prizes, in an unprecedented move made on 5 November, Mediacorp announced that all 12 finalists were all offered contracts, a first in Star Search history.

Development
The show's revival was first announced by the last season's host Quan Yi Fong and former contestants Christopher Lee and Zoe Tay during the Star Awards 2019 award ceremony held on 14 April 2019 (as part of the award's silver jubilee celebration), after featuring a walk-in showcase performance as one of the performance segments. A teaser clip was first shown on-air on that night, featuring Tay that bragged the show's success, how they changed their lives in their entertainment career and gone on winning awards from Star Awards, while the narrator narrates at the closing of the clip (今天的超级红星, 来自/出自于当年的才华新秀 (lit. The All-time Favorite Artistes that came/first appeared from that year's Star Search); displayed on-screen as 红星出于新秀 (lit. The stars originated from Star Search)); the season will be billed as one of the "biggest returns in television history".

To commemorate the franchise's return, Toggle archived the previous ten seasons of the show's grand finals.

Auditions
The auditions were announced on 14 April 2019 with the open auditions held on May; other auditions not announced on-air were Talent Scout Auditions, replacing overseas auditions, which were not held for the first time since the season five. Contestants can also submit their online applications (for Open auditions) until 10 May 2019. Selected contestants from the scouting or closed auditions may receive Express Pass (shaped as a chatbox with the show's hashtag) and could directly perform the talent round without having to queue. Known judges appeared in the auditions include Irene Ang, and former Star Search winners Qi Yuwu and Zoe Tay.

For the first time, augmented reality and virtual reality were used onto green screen during the acting segment in the auditions. The augmented reality version were also heavily used during the grand finals, notably the title card before and after commercial cuts, as well as the NOOOICE! guest performance.

Marketing
Jean Yip Group was the only sponsor to return from the past season. New sponsors include Bee Cheng Hiang, Bonia, KFC, Mitsubishi Electric, Simmons and Win2 Crackers, who previously sponsored another reality competition SPOP Sing! last year, as well as Samsung Galaxy, Senka, PD Door, Poh Heng jewelry, official car Audi and travel agency website Trip.com.

Top 24 Meet and Greet
A meet-and-greet session was held on 21 July 2019 at Funan's The Base, with special guests and former contestants Zoe Tay, Vivian Lai, Yao Wenlong and Brandon Wong. A second session was held on both locations at Gardens by the Bay and Woodlands Temporary Bus Interchange on 10 August 2019. A third meet-and-greet session, which also officiated the launch of the Samsung Galaxy Note 10 in Singapore, was held on Plaza Singapura on 17 August 2019. A fourth meet-and-greet session was held at Bugis+ on 15 September 2019.

Another meet-and-greet session featuring the top 12 finalists and former contestants will be held 19 October at Wisma Atria.

Screen Debut short videos
A 24 one-minute video series titled Screen Debut, each featuring a contestant pairing with guidance trained by former Star Search contestants, were uploaded on Toggle and aired as commercials starting on 30 August 2019. Each video featured different approaches and stories, and how the finalists made their debut on its first role and showcasing their talents.

Prelude episodes
Two prelude episodes were uploaded on Toggle on 20 and 27 September, and televised on Channel 8 two days after. The first prelude episode focus highlights on the auditions on the first half and training sessions on the second half, including never-seen behind-the-scenes of production for Screen Debut videos. The second prelude episode features mentoring sessions by star mentors Chen Hanwei, Huang Biren and Christopher Lee; during the second half, in a format similar to The Voice and The X Factor, as well as the third Project Superstar season and its ninth season which also involved mentoring, the finalists selected his or her mentor he or she wants to work with if available, and the mentors, each with four contestants per gender, will mentor their respective contestants through the remainder of the season. Both episodes were also captioned in English subtitles.

The Journey special
A special clip show episode, titled The Journey, was uploaded on Toggle on 8 November, and broadcast on 10 November at 3.05pm, right before the re-run of the Finals. The clip show features the final 12 in their preparation for the finals, including their interviews along with their mentors and the judges about the competition and training throughout the season.

Contestants
The 24 contestants was announced on 4 July 2019 in a live conference held at Gillman Barracks. On the second Prelude episode, 24 contestants were divided into three teams, with each team helmed by each mentor, who chose eight finalists (four per gender) to form a coaching team (the team names are respectively labeled in parenthesis) of their own to mentor them. The final 24 finalists and their respective teams were confirmed as follows:

Key:

Semifinals
The live semifinals will start on 6 October 2019 and 13 October 2019. Each week, twelve acts will perform; six will go through to the finals, and six will be eliminated.

Week 1 (6 October)
Overseas Judges: Phoebe Huang, Bowie Lam, Man Shu-sam
Media Judges: Chong Liung Man, Dasmond Koh, Marcus Wee, Ryan Lai, Terence Lim, Chloe Neo, Ang Eng Tee, Connie Chen

Tan Hao Thian withdrew prior to the semi-finals due to personal reasons; Tan was not replaced and the elimination went ahead as normal.

Round 1 and 2: Dance Round and WeMovie Acting Segment
The Dance round, along with the introduction dance, carries a 10% weightage towards the overall score. Following the segment, the finalists portrayed dramas segments of WeMovie He is 21 (他21岁) with the order of performance from the dance round played for the corresponding episodes. The acting segment weighs 40% towards the overall score.

Round 3: Media Charisma
Media Charisma carries a 30% weightage towards the overall score. At the end of each segment, the show will reveal the act with a current higher score based on the preferences by the Media judges. The results are as follows:

Round 4: Spontaneous Act
The fourth and final round, Spontaneous Act, carrying a 20% score, involve acts performing scenarios with a question given from the producers. Teams have one minute to discuss their order of performance, and each act had 25 seconds to present forth their answers.

Week 2 (13 October)
Overseas judges: Phoebe Huang, Bobby Au-yeung, Man Shu-sam
Media judges: Jeremy Tan, Mervin Wee, Irene Ang, Ryan Lai, Terence Lim, Connie Chen, Ang Eng Tee, Chong Liung Man

Round 1 and 2: Dance Round and WeMovie Acting Segment
Similar to Week 1, the 12 acts performed a dance and WeDrama Turning Chair (回转椅子) during the two segments, with the episode corresponding to the performance order during the dance round; both components weigh 10% and 40% towards the overall scores, respectively.

Round 3: Media Charisma
Media Charisma carries a 30% weightage towards the overall score. The results for the Charisma was revealed after each segment of the Acting round. The results are as follows:

Round 4: Spontaneous Act
The fourth and final round, Spontaneous Act, carrying a 20% score, involve acts performing scenarios with a question given from the producers. Teams have one minute to discuss their order of performance, and each act had 25 seconds to present forth their answers.

Finals
The final performances took place on November 3. During the end of the second semifinals, the hosts announced that the Samsung Galaxy's Most Photogenic Breakthrough Award (a cash prize of $10,000 and a trip to Seoul, South Korea) will be given out during the show, with the three mentors voting for the winner with the most improvements made throughout the season. The award went to Vanessa Ho of Team Huang Biren.
Guest judges: Doreen Neo, Stephen Fung, Simon Yam, Carina Lau, Man Shu-sam
Guest performers: Desmond Tan, Romeo Tan, Jeremy Chan, Jeffrey Xu, NOOOICE!

Round 1 & 2: X-Factor and Viral Dance segment
The X-Factor and Viral Dance segments carries 20% and 10% weightage towards the final scores respectively. The order is performed by the contestants for the respective genders.

Round 3: Eloquence Round
This round carries 20% weightage towards the final score. For this round, mentors and their contestants ballot on questions issued by each celebrity (acting as respective characters in selected scenes). Contestants have 25 seconds to present their answers for the scenarios.

Round 4: Acting Round
The fourth and final round carries a 50% score towards the final score. Contestants from each team will pair with a former Star Search finalist on a rendition of a previously aired Singaporean drama with a role played by the respective mentor.

Overall result

References

External links
 8World Official Website

2019 Singaporean television seasons